Richard Horton Beauclerc Toy  (9 May 1911 – 2 July 1995) was a New Zealand architect renowned for his church architecture.

Toy was born in Ignace, Ontario, Canada in 1911. His family moved to New Zealand in 1923. He enrolled in agriculture at Auckland University in 1930 before changing to architecture.

From 1939 he taught for many years at the Auckland School of Architecture, acting as the Chair of Design from 1959 to 1976. Toy's best known churches are in Auckland and include the Holy Trinity Cathedral in Parnell, St Martin's at St Chad's in Sandringham and All Saints in Ponsonby.

In the 1982 New Year Honours he was appointed an Officer of the Order of the British Empire, for services to architecture.

References

New Zealand architects
University of Auckland alumni
1911 births
1995 deaths
People from Kenora District
Canadian emigrants to New Zealand
Academic staff of the University of Auckland
New Zealand Officers of the Order of the British Empire
20th-century Canadian architects